Álvaro Barreirinhas Cunhal (10 November 1913 – 13 June 2005) was a Portuguese communist revolutionary and politician. He was one of the major opponents of the dictatorial regime of the Estado Novo. He served as secretary-general of the Portuguese Communist Party (PCP) from 1961 to 1992. He was one of the most pro-Soviet of all Western Europe communist leaders, often supporting the Soviet Union's foreign policies, including the Soviet invasion of Czechoslovakia in 1968. During the 1970s, Cunhal supported Soviet leader Leonid Brezhnev’s political agenda, and strongly opposed Mikhail Gorbachev’s perestroika policies in the 1980s.

Life

Cunhal was born in Coimbra, the third child of Avelino Henriques da Costa Cunhal (Seia, Seia, 28 October 1887 – Coimbra, Sé Nova, 19 December 1966) and wife (m. Coimbra, Sé Nova, 22 August 1908) Mercedes Simões Ferreira Barreirinhas (Coimbra, Sé Nova, 5 May 1888 – Lisbon, 12 September 1971). His father was a lawyer in Coimbra and Seia, and later on in Lisbon, and came from a family of rural bourgeoisie, related to a rich and more aristocratic family, the Cunhal Patrício. His mother was a devout Catholic who wished her son had also become one. He also studied Law at the University of Lisbon, where he joined the Portuguese Communist Party, which was an illegal organisation, in 1931. The deaths of his younger sister Maria Mansueta Barrerinhas Cunhal (Coimbra – Seia, 13 January 1921) and of his older brother António José Barreirinhas Cunhal (Coimbra, 1910 – Lisbon, 1932) struck the grief of both his parents and brothers, but specially of his mother and Álvaro, of whom they had always been close. He visited the Soviet Union for the first time in 1935 to attend the Seventh World Congress of the Comintern in Moscow. He joined the Central Committee of the party in 1936. His first arrest occurred in 1937, at the age of 23.

While in prison, Cunhal submitted his final thesis on the topic of abortion and obtained his law degree (the jury included future Prime Minister Marcello Caetano, who would later replace Salazar). In his thesis, Cunhal supports the legalization of abortion in Portugal, while he also scrutinised the case of abortion in the Soviet Union, who had been made legal during Vladimir Lenin rule but outlawed once again by Stalin, in 1936 (which Cunhal supported, claiming abortion was not practised anymore in the Soviet Union), highlighting the dangers and societal costs of illegal abortions in his country and exploring the reasons that led women to decide to end their pregnancy. He then taught for some months at the Colégio Moderno, in Lisbon. Among his pupils was the future President of Portugal, Mário Soares, who would become one of his great political rivals after the coup of 1974.
From 1941 to 1949, Cunhal lived "underground" and became the de facto party leader. Arrested by the PIDE in 1949, he remained in prison for 11 years until a spectacular escape from the seaside Peniche prison in 1960. The government of António Salazar claimed that a Soviet submarine was near the Peniche coast waiting for Cunhal. In 1961, Cunhal was elected as the party's secretary-general, following the death of Bento Gonçalves in the political prisoners colony of Tarrafal in Cape Verde. Cunhal lived in exile in Moscow, where his daughter Ana Cunhal was born on December 25, 1960, and Paris until the Carnation Revolution of April 1974.

Back in Portugal, Cunhal took charge of the newly-legalized Portuguese Communist Party and led the party through the political upheavals which followed the revolution. He was minister without portfolio in several of the provisional governments which followed the revolution of 1974. A faction of army officers seen as aligned with the party dominated the post-revolutionary provisional governments, with the pro-communist prime minister Vasco Gonçalves leading four provisional governments, which brought accusations that the party was attempting to take power via the military. Cunhal was largely responsible for the party's hardline attitude, particularly its hostility towards the Socialist Party led by Soares, which prevented the formation of a united left.

Cunhal left his office in 1992. He was succeeded by Carlos Carvalhas, but his voice remained important in the following years, and he consistently sided with the party's most orthodox wing. He also revealed that under the pseudonym Manuel Tiago he had been the author of several neo-realistic novels. His drawings, made while in prison, were published, revealing his sensibility for the arts, as was also shown by his translation of King Lear by Shakespeare (edited in his last years, and originally written under the female pseudonym Maria Manuela Serpa).

Álvaro Cunhal died in Lisbon in 2005, after several years out of the public eye. His funeral took place on 15 June in Lisbon and was attended by more than 250,000 people.

His only remaining sister Maria Eugénia Barreirinhas Cunhal (Lisbon, 17 January 1927 – 10 December 2015) had also been a lifelong party militant. She married in Lisbon on 21 May 1949 medical doctor Fernando Manuel da Rocha de Medina (Lisbon, 15 March 1924 – Lisbon, 9 September 1965), half-cousin of Ambassador Rui Eduardo Barbosa de Medina, and left four children.

Works 

 IV Congresso do Partido Communista Português — O Caminho Para o Derrubamento do Fascismo.
 Duas intervenções numa reunião de quadros.
 Rumo à Vitória - As Tarefas do Partido na Revolução Democrática e Nacional.
 A Questão do Estado, Questão Central de Cada Revolução.
 A Verdade e a Mentira sobre a Revolução de Abril.
 Acção Revolucionária, Capitulação e Aventura.
 O Partido Com Paredes de Vidro.
 A Revolução Portuguesa - O Passado e o Futuro.
 Fracasso e Derrota do Governo de Direita do PSD/Cavaco Silva.
 O 1º Governo PSD e a Resistência Democrática.
 Falência da Política de Direita do PS (1983–1985).
 Os Chamados Governos de Iniciativa Presidencial.

Fiction works under the pseudonym Manuel Tiago 

Cunhal was also a fiction writer, with several novels under the pseudonym Manuel Tiago, which he recognized as his own only in 1995. He also made the drawings for the original edition of Soeiro Pereira Gomes' book Esteiros. He published the following books under the pseudonym of Manuel Tiago:

 Até Amanhã, Camaradas (adapted to television series in 2005).
 Cinco Dias, Cinco Noites (adapted to film in 1996).
 A Estrela de Seis Pontas.
 A Casa de Eulália.
 Lutas e Vidas. Um conto.
 Os Corrécios e outros Contos.
 Um Risco na Areia.
 Fronteiras.

See also 

 Armed Revolutionary Action

Further reading 
 Cunha, Carlos. The Portuguese Communist Party’s Strategy for Power, 1921–1986 (Garland, 1992).  online

References

External links
 José Pacheco Pereira, Álvaro Cunhal — Uma biografia política, Temas & Debates, Lisbon, 1999, .
 The Guardian - Obituary.
 https://www.avante.pt/pt/2069/pcp/126282/%C3%81lvaro-Cunhal-defendeu-a-tese-de-licenciatura-h%C3%A1-73-anos.htm

1913 births
2005 deaths
People from Coimbra
Portuguese anti-fascists
Portuguese atheists
Portuguese Communist Party politicians
Portuguese communists
Recipients of the Order of Lenin
Portuguese male writers
Portuguese prisoners and detainees
Prisoners and detainees of Portugal
Portuguese exiles
People granted political asylum in the Soviet Union
Former Roman Catholics